The Gazli gas field is a natural gas field located in the Xorazm Province. It was discovered in 1956 and developed by and Uzbekneftegaz. It began production in 1960 and produces natural gas and condensates. The total proven reserves of the Gazli gas field are around 25 trillion cubic feet (714 km3), and production is slated to be around 479 Million cubic feet/day (13.7×105m3) in 2013.

References

Natural gas fields in Uzbekistan
Natural gas fields in the Soviet Union